Carex aphylla is a tussock-forming species of perennial sedge in the family Cyperaceae. It is native to southern parts of South America.

See also
List of Carex species

References

aphylla
Plants described in 1837
Taxa named by Carl Sigismund Kunth
Flora of Chile
Flora of Argentina